North Vernon is a city in Jennings County, Indiana, United States. The population was 6,608 as of the 2020 census.

History
North Vernon was originally called Tripton, sometimes referred to as “The Gem of the Midwest” and under the latter name was platted in 1854.

Annadale, North Vernon Downtown Historic District, State Street Historic District, and Walnut Street Historic District are listed on the National Register of Historic Places.

Geography
North Vernon is located at  (39.004991, -85.627758).

Climate
The climate in this area is characterized by hot, humid summers and typically cold mid-west winters.

Demographics

2010 census
As of the census of 2010, there were 6,728 people, 2,656 households, and 1,667 families living in the city. The racial makeup of the city was 95.0% White, 1.5% African American, 0.2% Native American, 0.4% Asian, 1.2% from other races, and 1.7% from two or more races. Hispanic or Latino of any race were 2.4% of the population.

There were 2,656 households, of which 35.8% had children under the age of 18 living with them, 39.9% were married couples living together, 17.0% had a female householder with no husband present, 5.9% had a male householder with no wife present, and 37.2% were non-families. 31.1% of all households were made up of individuals, and 12.4% had someone living alone who was 65 years of age or older. The average household size was 2.43 and the average family size was 3.01.

The median age in the city was 35.6 years. 26.5% of residents were under the age of 18; 9.7% were between the ages of 18 and 24; 26.3% were from 25 to 44; 23.4% were from 45 to 64; and 14.1% were 65 years of age or older. The gender makeup of the city was 47.8% male and 52.2% female.

2000 census
As of the census of 2000, there were 6,515 people, 2,665 households, and 1,684 families living in the city. The racial makeup of the city was 96.47% White, 1.49% African American, 0.20% Native American, 0.40% Asian, 0.28% from other races, and 1.17% from two or more races. Hispanic or Latino of any race were 1.04% of the population.

There were 2,665 households, out of which 33.1% had children under the age of 18 living with them, 44.9% were married couples living together, 13.6% had a female householder with no husband present, and 36.8% were non-families. 32.0% of all households were made up of individuals, and 13.8% had someone living alone who was 65 years of age or older. The average household size was 2.39 and the average family size was 3.01.

In the city, the population was spread out, with 27.5% under the age of 18, 10.1% from 18 to 24, 28.1% from 25 to 44, 19.3% from 45 to 64, and 15.0% who were 65 years of age or older. The median age was 34 years. For every 100 females, there were 84.9 males. For every 100 females age 18 and over, there were 82.4 males.

The median income for a household in the city was $34,244, and the median income for a family was $41,020. Males had a median income of $31,173 versus $21,137 for females. The per capita income for the city was $16,836. About 7.6% of families and 11.8% of the population were below the poverty line, including 15.5% of those under age 18 and 14.8% of those age 65 or over.

Education
The town has a lending library, the Jennings County Public Library.

Notable people
Pat O'Connor (racing driver)
Royce Campbell
Scott Earl

References

Cities in Indiana
Cities in Jennings County, Indiana
Micropolitan areas of Indiana